3rd Floor is an album by Norwegian girl band Lilyjets in 2006. It was released on the Bennier Music label.

Track listing
"On Top"
"Hit by a Girl"
"Perfect Picture (It Would Be Better)"
"Going Blind"
"Brand New Place"
"Today"
"Don't Let It Go to Your Head" (Josh Alexander, Billy Steinberg, F. Dobson)
cover, original song by Fefe Dobson
"Since You Been Gone"
"Hitchiker"
"Aileen"
"Crave"
"1000 Songs"

Singles
 "Going Blind"
 "Crave"
 "Don't Let It Go to Your Head" (Alexander, Steinberg, Dobson)
cover, original song by Fefe Dobson
 "Perfect Picture (It Would Be Better)"

Music video 
There is an official music video for "Don't Let It Go to Your Head".

References 

2006 albums